Rockets is a German professional basketball team. It is originally based in Gotha, Germany but plays its home games in Erfurt. The Rockets are the first team of the BiG Gotha basketball club.

In 2017, Rockets promoted to the Basketball Bundesliga (BBL), the German first tier. Following its debut season in the BBL, the professional team of Rockets was dissolved. Since 2018-19 season the team plays in the 2. Regional League under the name BiG Rockets Gotha.

History

The Oettinger Rockets were found as the first team of the club Gotha e.V. which was founded on 2 July 1998. The team started in the Bezirksliga and promoted to the fourth tier 1.Regionliga in 2005.

In the 2009–10 season, the Rockets were promoted to the national third level, the ProB. In the 2011–12 season, Gotha was crowned ProB champions and the team was promoted to the second tier level ProA.

Since the 2016–17 season, the Rockets play in the Messe Erfurt, which has a capacity of 3,236 people. On 3 May 2017 the team earned promotion to the Basketball Bundesliga by beating Niners Chemnitz in the semi-finals of the ProA to claim a promotion spot.

Rockets Gotha started the 2017–18 season as "Oettinger Rockets", named after its main sponsor Oettinger Brauerei. However, from January 2018 the main sponsor left and the club would be simply known as "Rockets". In its debut season in the BBL, Rockets ended in the 17th place and relegated back to the ProA. In July 2018, the organization announced that it was not able to play in the professional ProA league.

The same year the second team of Rockets managed to win the 1. Regional League South-East and promote to the ProB. Due to loss of the main sponsor Oettinger Brauerei the team decided to sell their ProB licence to Basketball Löwen Erfurt and continue to compete in the 2. Regional League under the name of BiG (Basketball in Gotha) Rockets Gotha.

Honours
ProB
Winners: 2011–12

Players

Notable players

 Konstantin Klein
 Andreas Obst
 Ekenechukwu Ibekwe
 Nemanja Jaramaz
 David Hicks
 Darrel Mitchell
 Marcus Monk
 Travis Warech

Current roster

Head coaches

Season by season

Source: Eurobasket.com

Sponsorship names

Due to sponsorship reasons, the team has been known as:
Oettinger Rockets (2006–2017)

References

External links
Rockets Gotha official website 
BiG Gotha official website 

Basketball teams in Germany
Basketball teams established in 1998
Gotha
Sport in Erfurt